There was a building called Christ Church based in central Birmingham,  in the Church of England on Colmore Row, Birmingham from 1805 to 1899. 

In 2021 a new church without a fixed building called Christ Church Birmingham opened and now serves communities across the City and beyond.it meets in south Aston.

History

The church building was built by public subscription. The site was donated by William Phillips Ing. The foundation stone was laid on 22 July 1805 by George Legge, 3rd Earl of Dartmouth. The Earl of Dartmouth was representing King George III, who had intended to lay the foundation stone personally, but was prevented from doing so by illness. The King gave £1,000 (equivalent to £ in ) towards the construction. The final cost was £26,000. The original architect was Birmingham-based William Hollins.

It was consecrated on 6 July 1813 by James Cornwallis, 4th Earl Cornwallis, the Bishop of Lichfield. It was unusual in that all of the seating on the ground floor was free, and it came to be known as the 'Free Church'.

It was built in stone in the Classical style with Doric columns dominating the west front. The square west tower, completed in 1814, supported an octagonal belfry and an octagonal spire. The original design had included a cupola instead of a spire. The catacombs beneath the church were believed to contain the re-interred remains of John Baskerville.

The parish was assigned from St Martin in the Bull Ring and St. Philips' Church in 1865.

The building and site were sold in 1897; the proceeds were used to build St Agatha's Church, Sparkbrook. The church was demolished in 1899. Part of the parish was given to St Barnabas' Church, Birmingham.

In 2021 a new church without a fixed building called Christ Church Birmingham opened and now serves communities across the City and beyond.

Vicars
John Hume Spry 1813 – 1824
Archdeacon George Hodson 1824 – 1832
John George Breay 1832 – 1840
George Lea 1840 – 1864 (afterwards vicar of St George's Church, Edgbaston)
Charles Marson 1864 – 1871  (afterwards vicar of Clevedon, Somerset)
Albert Workman 1871 – 1881 
Rev Prebendary E.R. Mason 1881 – 1888 (afterwards vicar of Oxton, Nottinghamshire)
Rev Prebendary C.B. Willcox 1889 – 1897 (formerly vicar of St Jude's Church, Moorfield, Sheffield)

Organ

An organ was installed by Thomas Elliot, of London.

Organists
Thomas Munden 1818 – 1856

Burials 

Notable people buried at the church include:

 Joseph Frederick Ledsam (1791–1862), Deputy Lord Lieutenant of Warwick, High Sheriff of Worcestershire and deputy chairman of the London and North Western Railway

References

Churches completed in 1813
Church of England church buildings in Birmingham, West Midlands
Buildings and structures demolished in 1899
Christ Church
1805 establishments in England